Liel Abada (born ) is an Israeli professional footballer who plays as a winger or as a forward for Scottish Premiership club Celtic and the Israel national team.

Early and personal life
Abada was born in Petah Tikva, Israel, to a family of Mizrahi Jewish descent. At the age of 13, his first manager in Maccabi Petah Tikva took Abada's father Ronen and him to celebrate his Bar Mitzvah in Barcelona. His younger brother Orel Abada is also a footballer who plays for Hapoel Ra'anana. Abada is observant and does not play football on the Jewish high holiday of Yom Kippur.

He has been in a relationship with his Israeli girlfriend Bar Rashti since 2020, after three months separated they have returned to each other since June 2022.

Club career

Maccabi Petah Tikva 
Abada made his professional debut for Maccabi Petah Tikva in the Israel State Cup on 22 August 2019, coming on as a 63rd minute substitute against Hakoah Amidar Ramat Gan, in a match that ended in a 4–1 home win for his team. On 9 September 2019, he scored his first senior Israeli Liga Leumit goal in the 90th minute against Bnei Sakhnin, that finished as a 1–1 home draw for Maccabi Petah Tikva. On 30 August 2020, Abada scored his first Israeli Premier League goal, which coincided with his team's 86th minute winning goal, earning his side a 1–2 away victory over Maccabi Tel Aviv.

Celtic
On 14 July 2021, Scottish Premiership club Celtic announced the signing of Abada on a five-year contract, for a reported fee of £3.6 million. On 20 July 2021, he scored on his debut in the first leg of Celtic's Champions League second round qualifying match against Danish side Midtjylland, that ended in a 1–1 home draw. On 5 August 2021, Abada scored his first UEFA Europa League qualifiers goal against Czech side Jablonec, that ended in a 2–4 away win for his team. On 4 November 2021, he scored the crucial third goal for Celtic in a 2021–22 UEFA Europea League Group stage match against Hungarian side Ferencváros, that ended in a 2–3 away victory for his team.

On 21 August 2021, in his third Scottish Premiership appearance, Abada scored both his and Celtic's first two league goals, that lead to a 6–0 home victory over St. Mirren. On 26 December 2021, Abada netted an early brace in a 2021–22 Scottish Premiership match against St. Johnstone, earning his team a 1–3 away win.

On 2 May 2022, Abada has become the first ever non-European (and the first Israeli) footballer to win the PFA Scotland Young Player of the Year award.

On 28 August 2022, Abada scored a hat-trick and assisted one goal, in a 9–0 away win against Dundee United in the 2022–23 Scottish Premiership. On 3 September 2022, he scored both the first and third goal against Rangers in an Old Firm derby league match, that ended in a 4–0 home win for Celtic. Abada made his debut UEFA Champions League Group stage appearance on 6 September 2022, opening against Spanish side Real Madrid. On 19 October 2022, he scored a brace in the span of 11 minutes and later on added an assist against Motherwell in the 2022–23 Scottish League Cup quarter-finals, to lead his team to a 4–0 away victory.

In January 2023, Abada was featured in the official 40-man list composed by UEFA.com – which named the best young players in the continent that: "have the potential to take European football by storm in 2023".

International career
He also plays for Israel's U-21 since 2020.

Abada was first called up to the Israeli senior side on 18 March 2021, ahead of the 2022 FIFA World Cup qualification (UEFA). He  made his senior debut with the Israel national team on 5 June 2021, in a friendly match against Montenegro, where he substituted Yonas Malede in the 61st minute with the score at 0–0; the game ended with a 3–1 away victory for Israel. He scored his first senior goal against Iceland, during a 2022–23 UEFA Nations League match on 2 June 2022, which ended in a 2–2 home draw for his native Israel.

Career statistics

Club

International 

Scores and results list Israel's goal tally first, score column indicates score after each Abada goal.

Honours
Celtic
Scottish Premiership: 2021–22
Scottish League Cup: 2021–22 2022–23

Individual
PFA Scotland Young Player of the Year: 2021–22

See also
List of Jewish footballers
List of Jews in sports
List of Israelis
Nir Bitton

References

External links
 
 
 
 UEFA.com: Players to watch out for in 2023: Who could star in European football this year? | UEFA Champions League, 4 January 2023

2001 births
Living people
Israeli Mizrahi Jews
Israeli footballers
Jewish footballers
Jewish Israeli sportspeople
Israel international footballers
Israel youth international footballers
Israel under-21 international footballers
Maccabi Petah Tikva F.C. players
Celtic F.C. players
Israeli Premier League players
Liga Leumit players
Scottish Professional Football League players
Israeli expatriate footballers
Expatriate footballers in Scotland
Israeli expatriate sportspeople in Scotland
Footballers from Petah Tikva
21st-century Israeli Jews
Association football wingers
Association football forwards